Sandana is a village in Hilauli block of Unnao district, Uttar Pradesh, India. As of 2011, its population is 6,082, in 1,184 households, and it has 3 primary schools and no healthcare facilities.

The 1961 census recorded Sandana as comprising 15 hamlets, with a total population of 3,454 (1,831 male and 1,623 female), in 570 households and 474 physical houses. The area of the village was given as 2,289 acres.

References

Villages in Unnao district